The Lingjiao Waterfall is a waterfall in Pingxi District, New Taipei, Taiwan.

History
In October 2020, the New Taipei City Government banned water sports from the water around the waterfall following the death of a college student during the summer of 2020.

Geology
The waterfall flows to the Keelung River.

Transportation
The waterfall is accessible within walking distance south of Lingjiao Station of Taiwan Railways.

See also
 List of waterfalls

References

Waterfalls of New Taipei